Cantareus apertus, commonly known as the green garden snail, is a species of air-breathing land snail, a terrestrial pulmonate gastropod mollusc in the family Helicidae, the typical snails.

Distribution
Cantareus apertus is native to Europe primarily near the Mediterranean Sea, and also North Africa.

Distribution of Cantareus apertus include:
 France west of Rhone estuary It is protected in France, must not be collected for commercial purposes.
 Islands in the Tyrrhenian Sea
 Italy, Italian peninsula to Liguria and Romagna
 Ionian islands
 Central Greece
 Aegean Islands
 Cyprus (only one locality)
 Mediterranean north Africa

In Salento it is known as municeḍḍe and in Sicily as attuppateḍḍu.

It has also been introduced to other areas:
 It has become established in California and Louisiana.
 Western Australia – nonindigenous

This species is already established in the United States, and is considered to represent a potentially serious threat as a pest, an invasive species which could negatively affect agriculture, natural ecosystems, human health or commerce. Therefore, it has been suggested that this species be given top national quarantine significance in the USA.

Description 
The shell has periostracum which is olive green in colour. The last whorl is much larger than the others.
The width of the shell is 22–28 mm.; the height of the shell is also 22–28 mm.

Ecology 
Cantareus apertus inhabits Mediterranean shrublands, near cultivated fields, gardens. In Gavdos (Greece) also in woodland spreading on recently abandoned cultivated fields, more rarely in natural habitats.

In Crete this species is active for 3–4 months after the first rainfalls in October. It aestivates buried relatively deep in the soil. In hot, dry weather, it burrows three to six inches into the ground and becomes dormant until rain softens the soil. A white convex epiphragm is created for aestivation.

This species of snail makes and uses love darts.

References
This article incorporates public domain text from the reference.

External links
 

Gastropods described in 1778
Taxa named by Ignaz von Born
Helicidae